Ibtisam Mara'ana-Menuhin is an Israeli Arab politician, film director, and producer. She was a member of the Knesset for the Labor Party.

Biography 
Ibtisam Mara'ana was born in 1975 in Fureidis, a Muslim Arab village in northern Israel. She attended film school at Givat Haviva. In 2000 she initiated a film and television program at her former high school in Fureidis.

In June 2014, Mara'ana married Boaz Menuhin, a Jewish Israeli man. The couple has a daughter. The marriage was sealed in Tel Aviv in a non-religious ceremony, and is therefore not officially recognised in Israel,

Film and teaching career

In 2003 Mara'ana founded Ibtisam Films, to produce documentaries that investigate the borders and boundaries of Palestinian and Israeli society, with a focus on women and minorities. Her work explores gender, class, racism, and collective and individual identity. Her films show the plight of Arab-Palestinians living as a minority within Israel, while, at the same time, critique deep-rooted practices within Arab-Palestinian society. Her work has been screened on television and at festivals worldwide.

Mara'ana teaches at various educational institutions, including the Bezalel Academy of Art and Design in Jerusalem. As a feminist activist, she appears at universities and conferences as a public speaker, and has published numerous articles in Israeli newspapers. In 2009, the Israeli newspaper Haaretz named Mara'ana as one of the 10 most influential women in Israel.

In 2011 Druze-Israeli Jamila "Maya" Fares, the sister of Angelina Fares, the subject of Mara’ana's Lady Kul El Arab documentary, was murdered in an honour killing. In response to the murder, Mara'ana created a foundation to support Arab women fleeing gender-based violence in Israel.

Political career
Prior to the 2009 Knesset elections Mara'ana was placed twelfth on the Meretz list. However, she withdrew her candidacy shortly before to the elections after Meretz expressed support for Operation Cast Lead in Gaza.

In January 2021, Mara'ana ran in the Israeli Labor Party primaries, and placed seventh on the party's list for the March 2021 elections. On 17 February Mara'ana was disqualified from running in the election by the Central Elections Committee by a 16–15 vote, with two abstentions, citing anti-Zionist remarks, as well as her public refusal in 2012 to observe the Memorial Day siren – she later apologized for the latter. The disqualification was subsequently repealed by the Supreme Court. She was subsequently elected to the Knesset as the Labor Party won seven seats, becoming the first Knesset member in a mixed Jewish-Muslim relationship.

Filmography 
Paradise Lost (2003). Mara'ana traces the hidden history of her village, Fureidis, investigating issues of national identity and womanhood within traditional Arab village life.
Al-Jiser (2004), a look into the lives of residents of the Jisr az-Zarqa village in Israel who face poverty and discrimination. The film focuses on the struggle of a group of young single women who are determined to bring social change to their village.
Badal (2006). A Badal marriage refers to the custom of a brother and sister from one family marrying a sister and brother from another family. Divorce on the part of one couple means the other couple must also  divorce. The film follows a family during the process of arranging such a marriage. It portrays the lives of Palestinian women in Israel: their struggles in being a part of their traditional society vs. the quest to maintain their full rights as women and citizens of a Jewish state.
Three Times Divorced (2007) is about a Palestinian woman from the Gaza Strip who marries an Arab Bedouin from Israel. After bearing six children, her husband divorces her and maintains custody of the children, while the woman, whose residency status in Israel becomes uncertain, is left with nothing.
Lady Kul El-Arab (2008). Angelina Fares, a young woman from the Druze village of Sajur in northern Israel and the country's first Druze model, becomes a finalist in the 2007 Miss Israel beauty pageant. Facing severe pressure and death threats from her village, Angelina must decide whether to go forward with her fashion world dreams, or to resign. The story follows Angelina's struggle to reconcile the traditions and values of her society with her bold efforts to choose her own way in life.
77 Steps (2010) documents the personal journey of the director who leaves her Arab-Muslim village to live in Tel Aviv. In an attempt to find an apartment in the city, she encounters discrimination and rejection by most landlords because of her Arab origins. She finally finds an apartment and meets her neighbor – Jonathan, a Jewish-Canadian and recent immigrant to Israel. A complicated love story develops.
Write down, I Am an Arab (2014) is a biographical documentary film about the national Palestinian poet Mahmoud Darwish. The movie covers Mahmoud Darwish's love letters to his Jewish girlfriend from the past, Tamar Ben-Ami, his marriage with Rana Kabbani, his first wife, and his part in the Palestinian-Israeli conflict. The movie contains interviews with Ahmad Darwish (Mahmoud's brother) and with his fellow poets and writers as well as with Samih al-Qasim, who was Mahmoud Darwish's friend.

Awards and recognition 
In 2017, Mara'ana received an honorary degree from the British Open University.

See also
Women of Israel

References

External links 

Write Down, I Am an Arab: The Film About Mahmoud Darwish 
Haaretz Article by Ibtisam Mara'ana "I Carry the Virus"
Haaretz Article by Ibtisam Mara'ana "Gender Before Nationality"
Lady Kul-el Arab at IDFA
Now Magazine Review
Badal on LinkTV
Three Times Divorced on Women Make Movies
Three Times Divorced on Media Reviews Online 
Haaretz Article by Ibtisam Mara'ana "I was once ashamed of my mother's power"
Haaretz Article by Ibtisam Mara'ana "Yalla, intifada!"
Al Jazeera on Paradise Lost & Badal 
Al Jazeera "Palestinian Filmmaker wins at HotDocs"
Al Jazeera on Lady Kul El-Arab 
Badal

1975 births
Living people
Arab-Israeli film directors
Israeli women film directors
Israeli documentary film directors
Women documentary filmmakers
Israeli Labor Party politicians
Members of the 24th Knesset (2021–2022)
Women members of the Knesset
Arab members of the Knesset
Arab Israeli anti-racism activists